Peter E. Hanson (June 12, 1845 – February 11, 1914) was an American politician and businessman.

Biography
Hanson was born in Branstad, Sweden on June 12, 1845. He emigrated with his parents to the United States in 1857 and settled in Meeker County, Minnesota. Hanson was involved with the banking business in Litchfield and served as president of the Litchfield County Bank. He also was involved with the real estate business and with farming.

Hanson served on the Meeker County Board of Commissioners and was a Republican. He also served in the Minnesota Senate from 1895 to 1898. Hanson served as the Minnesota Secretary of State from 1901 to 1907.

Hanson died from a stroke while at the Warner's Hot Springs Hotel near San Diego, California on February 11, 1914.

Notes

External links

1845 births
1914 deaths
Swedish emigrants to the United States
People from Litchfield, Minnesota
Businesspeople from Minnesota
Farmers from Minnesota
County commissioners in Minnesota
Republican Party Minnesota state senators
Secretaries of State of Minnesota